Bughda Kandi (also Romanized as Būghdā Kandī; also known as Bugda-Kend and Bukda Kandi) is a village in Bughda Kandi Rural District, in the Central District of Zanjan County, Zanjan Province, Iran. At the 2006 census, its population was 1,036, in 258 families.

References 

Populated places in Zanjan County